Mandal is a town in Lindesnes municipality in Agder county, Norway. Mandal is the fourth largest town in Agder as well as the administrative centre of Lindesnes municipality. It is located at the mouth of the river Mandalselva at the southern end of the Mandalen valley.

Mandal has a few suburban villages lying just outside its borders such as Ime immediately to the east and Sånum to the southwest.

History
The area in which today's town of Mandal is located was not developed during the Middle Ages. During the 1300s, a trading post called Vester-Risør grew up along the Skogsfjorden, just west of the present-day town. The town began when King Eric of Pomerania gave the town the right to trade salmon. By the 1500s, Vesterrisør was a bustling port and trading centre, making it one of the oldest in Agder. In 1632, the trading post was given ladested rights, which included special trading privileges. During the mid-1600s, the name of the town was changed to Mandal. Salmon fishing and the timber industry pushed the town's growth even more during the 1700s. In 1779, the town's ladested status was formalized in the law. Mandal Church was completed in 1821 after the old church burned down in the town's fire of 1810.

On 1 January 1838, the small ladested was granted self-governing rights under the new formannskapsdistrikt law. In 1921, Mandal was designated as a kjøpstad, giving it full town status under the law. During the 1960s, there were many municipal mergers across Norway due to the work of the Schei Committee. On 1 January 1964, the town of Mandal (population: 5,446) was merged with the neighboring municipality of Halse og Harkmark (population: 3,676) and most of the municipality of Holum (population: 1,127) to form a new, larger municipality of Mandal.  Today, the town is also a tourist destination, especially due to its Sjøsanden beach.

Name
The town is named after the valley (and river) in which it is located: Mandalen. The name Mandal which comes from the Old Norse name .

Prior to 1653, the town was named Vesterrisør (meaning "western Risør"). The name was originally referring to the island Risøya outside the town, and the first element was added in the 16th century to distinguish it from the town of Østerrisør (meaning "eastern Risør"), which is now simply called Risør.

Notable people

Media gallery

See also
List of towns and cities in Norway

References

Populated places in Agder
Cities and towns in Norway
 
Port cities and towns of the North Sea
Port cities and towns in Norway
1632 establishments in Norway